Basyoun is a city and municipal division in the Gharbia Governorate, Egypt. It is the hometown of Egyptian International footballers Ahmed El Mohamady (Elmo) and Mohamed Salah (Mo Salah).

Notable people
Saad El Shazly, Egyptian commander
Ahmed Elmohamady, defender who plays for English club Aston Villa FC
Mohamed Salah, a forward who plays for English club Liverpool FC

See also

 List of cities and towns in Egypt

Notes

References

Populated places in Gharbia Governorate